Command and Control is a 2016 American documentary film directed by Robert Kenner and based on the 2013 non-fiction  book of the same name by Eric Schlosser. It was released initially in the United States at the Tribeca Film Festival and then in the United Kingdom at the Sheffield Doc/Fest on June 11, 2016. It is based on the 1980 Damascus Titan missile explosion in Damascus, Arkansas between September 18–19, 1980.  The film aired on the PBS network series American Experience on January 10, 2017.

Reception

It received a score of 78% on Metacritic and won the award for Best Documentary Screenplay from the Writers Guild of America.

The film was among 15 on the "shortlist" for the Academy Award for Best Documentary Feature (in respect of the 89th Academy Awards) but was not among the five nominees.

Tirdad Derakhshani of The Philadelphia Inquirer wrote, "[Will] have your heart racing."

Film facts
Parts of the film were filmed at the Titan Missile Museum in Green Valley, Arizona.

References

External links
 

2016 films
2016 documentary films
American documentary television films
American Experience
Documentary films about nuclear war and weapons
2010s English-language films
2010s American films
Films set in Arkansas
Van Buren County, Arkansas